Sofya Berultseva  (born 6 November 2000) is a Kazakhstani Professional karateka Olympic bronze medallist, she represents Kazakhstan internationally at Kumite (Karate) events.

Career
Berultseva has won several medals at Asian Karate Championships (Continental Championship) in individual kumite category and she also won several medals, including gold, silver and bronze medals, in the World Karate Federation Karate 1 Leagues and Series Championships.

In 2021, she won gold medal in the Karate 1 Premier League  Karate Championships held at Istanbul, Turkey.

She competed at the World Olympic Qualification Tournament held in Paris, France hoping to qualify for  2020 Summer Olympics in Tokyo, Japan. She did not qualify at this tournament but she was able to qualify via Continental representation soon after.

She gained a bronze medal for Kazakhstan in Women’s +61 Kg Kumite Category  at the Karate competition of the 2020 Summer Olympics in Tokyo, Japan. Feryal Abdelaziz beat her, 5:4, to claim a place in the gold medal event against Azerbaijan’s Irina Zaretska. Berultseva however was guaranteed a bronze medal as peculiarly karate does not have a third place play-off match and the losing semi finalists both get a bronze medal.

In December 2021, she won the silver medal in her event at the Asian Karate Championships held in Almaty, Kazakhstan. She also won one of the bronze medals in the women's team kumite event.

She won the gold medal in the women's +68 kg event at the 2022 World Games held in Birmingham, United States. She defeated María Torres of Spain in her gold medal match. She also won the gold medal in her event at the 2021 Islamic Solidarity Games held in Konya, Turkey.

Achievements

References

External links 
 
 

2000 births
Living people
Place of birth missing (living people)
Kazakhstani female karateka
Karateka at the 2020 Summer Olympics
Olympic karateka of Kazakhstan
Medalists at the 2020 Summer Olympics
Olympic medalists in karate
Olympic bronze medalists for Kazakhstan
Competitors at the 2022 World Games
World Games gold medalists
World Games medalists in karate
People from Shymkent
Islamic Solidarity Games medalists in karate
Islamic Solidarity Games competitors for Kazakhstan
21st-century Kazakhstani women